Rubin B. Russell Jr. (born November 7, 1944) is an American former professional basketball player. He was selected in the 1967 NBA draft but instead played in the American Basketball Association. Rubin played for the Dallas Chaparrals and Kentucky Colonels during the 1967–68 ABA season and scored 141 points.

References

1944 births
Living people
American men's basketball players
Basketball players from Texas
Dallas Chaparrals players
Junior college men's basketball players in the United States
Kentucky Colonels players
North Texas Mean Green men's basketball players
Seattle SuperSonics draft picks
Shooting guards
Sportspeople from Fort Worth, Texas